"And Then There Was Shawn" is the seventeenth episode of the fifth season of the television series Boy Meets World, written by Jeff Menell and directed by Jeff McCracken. It premiered on ABC in the United States on February 27, 1998. The episode, a parody of various slasher films, features the cast being stalked by an unknown killer after being trapped in the school during detention. It has been frequently cited as one of the series' best episodes.

Plot 

After a fight between the recently broken up Cory (Ben Savage) and Topanga (Danielle Fishel) caused by Shawn (Rider Strong) escalates in Mr. Feeny's (William Daniels) class, Cory, Topanga, Shawn, Angela (Trina McGee), and Kenny (Richard Lee Jackson) are all given detention. Feeny leaves the room and the map screen pulls up, revealing "No One Gets Out Alive" written on the chalkboard in blood. The group find themselves locked in the room, and a creepy janitor appears in the hallway and grimaces at them through the door and refuses to let them out. A thumping is heard in the hallway, but is revealed to be Eric (Will Friedle) and Jack (Matthew Lawrence) bouncing a basketball. Suddenly, the lights briefly go out, and turn on revealing Kenny has been murdered by being stabbed through the head with a pencil.

The group tries to escape from the school but find all the exits chained shut. The lights flicker and a creepy song plays over the PA system, and a mysterious masked figure is seen lurking behind the group. Feeny suddenly appears and collapses, having been stabbed in the back with a pair of scissors. The group then finds the janitor's cleaning cart with his corpse inside. Shawn deduces that one of them is the killer with all of his other suspects now dead. Eric patrols the hallway and finds a girl, Jennifer Love Fefferman, or "Feffie" (Jennifer Love Hewitt), wandering. Eric suspects her of being the killer, but then begins kissing her after she says she isn't. The killer calls a pay phone in the hallway and says he will kill the group, and they retreat to the library.

Shawn suggests the group splits up. While wandering the library, Feffie is mortally wounded after the killer pushes a pile of books on top of her. As Eric comforts her in her dying moments, she says she knows who the killer is, but before she can reveal it they are both killed by another pile of books. With his roommate Eric dead, Jack worries he won't be able to pay his rent anymore, and tries to commit suicide by jumping out a window, but Angela stops him and reminds him Shawn is still his roommate and they can still afford the rent. Before they could go back inside, the killer appears and pushes them out the window to their deaths. Cory, Shawn and Topanga confront the killer, and Shawn unmasks him, revealing the killer is a doppelgänger of himself.

Shawn awakes in detention, revealing most of the events to have been a dream. He tells Feeny it is his fault the group is in detention. Cory and Topanga assure Shawn their break up isn't his fault, and Feeny decides to end detention. They all leave the room, but the killer appears again and runs out of the room. In a post-credits scene, Feeny dreams that he has a class of knowledgable, outstanding students. He awakens to a loud and unruly class, talking and throwing paper airplanes, and holds up a pair of scissors contemplatively.

Production 

"And Then There Was Shawn" was conceived as a parody of then-recent horror films Scream and I Know What You Did Last Summer. Episode director Jeff McCracken stated that the network was originally apprehensive about producing the episode, "They told us, 'You really departed from format, and it could be too scary for our audience.'" The episode used frequent handheld camera and point-of-view shots, inspired by the film Halloween. The episode departed from the show's usual visual format and mimicked the aesthetic style of a film, shooting out of sequence using a single-camera format, and without a studio audience. The reveal of Shawn being the killer is meant to represent, "staring at his jealousy, at his worst self." The writers also inserted numerous references to South Park and Scooby-Doo. The cast enjoyed filming the episode and being able to break character.

Jennifer Love Hewitt, the star of I Know What You Did Last Summer, was dating cast member Will Friedle at the time, and was cast in the episode at the suggestion of director Jeff McCracken.

Although it has often been claimed that Joe Turkel, known for roles in The Shining and Blade Runner, made an uncredited appearance as the creepy janitor, McCracken debunked this, and says the janitor was played by an unknown actor found by the casting directors, saying "They brought in that guy and we all just went, 'Yes, perfect.' I don’t even know if he’s an actor — I’ve never seen him again. He just had one of those looks."

Broadcast 
The episode earned an 8.5 Nielsen rating during its initial broadcast. Though not conceived as a Halloween episode (the series had produced "The Witches of Pennbrook" as its 1997 Halloween special), it was frequently rebroadcast on Halloween. Writer Jeff Menell states the network received some complaints from viewers claiming the episode was too scary.

Reception 
Various websites and reviewers have called "And Then There Was Shawn" one of the best episodes of Boy Meets World. A retrospective by The A.V. Club referred to it as the best episode of the series. Screen Rant called it "the perfect tribute to horror movies of the '90s". Yardbarker referred to it as "the greatest episode of any series on TGIF", IGN ranked it third on their list of the best episodes of the series. BuzzFeed ranked the episode fourth on its list of "The 15 Best Halloween TV Episodes Ever", and Us Weekly included it on their list of best Halloween episodes. The episode holds a 9.5 rating on IMDb, making it the highest rated episode of the series.

References

External links 

 

1998 American television episodes
Boy Meets World
Television episodes set in Philadelphia
Parodies of horror